The Beat: Go-Go's Fusion of Funk and Hip-Hop is a 2001 book written by Kip Lornell and Charles C. Stephenson, Jr. In 2009, an updated second edition of the book was published and retitled The Beat! Go-Go Music from Washington, D.C.

Synopisis
The Beat explores the musical, social, and cultural phenomenon of go-go music (a music genre is rooted in funk, soul and old-school hip hop) the only musical from indigenous to Washington, D.C., which features highly syncopated, nonstop beats.

Charles Stephenson (a political and cultural activist, and former manager of Experience Unlimited) and Kip Lornell (professor of Africana Studies at The George Washington University) provide a chronology of go-go music, from the influences of funk music, Pentecostal churches, and West African rhythms that influenced the genre, to the emerging popularity of the genre. The authors focused on prominent figures and institutions important to the shaping of go-go music, including accomplished go-go musicians Chuck Brown (the "Godfather of Go-Go"), Experience Unlimited, Rare Essence, and Trouble Funk.

Many other Washington, D.C.-based DJ's, band managers, concert promoters and film-makers who've provided significant influences to the genre, also provided their perspective of the genre.

Compilation album

The Beat: Go-Go's Fusion of Funk and Hip-Hop is a double-compilation album released on September 4, 2001 in conjunction with the release of book. The album features a compilation of songs by prominent go-go bands and old-school hip hop artist who contributed to the popularity of the genre between the early-80s to the late-90s.

Track listing

References

External links
The Beat: Go-Go's Fusion of Funk and Hip-Hop at AllMusic.com
The Beat: Go-Go's Fusion of Funk and Hip-Hop at Discogs.com
The Beat is Go Go - Teach the Beat: Bringing the distinctive D.C. sound of go-go into the classroom.
 Go-Go playlist on Spotify

2001 non-fiction books
Billboard (magazine)
2001 compilation albums
Go-go
Go-go albums